Caochangmen/NUA/JSSNU station, also known simply as Caochangmen station, is a station on Line 4 of the Nanjing Metro, and a planned interchange station with the future Line 7. It opened on January 18, 2017 alongside seventeen other stations as part of Line 4's first phase. The station is oriented on an east–west axis, underneath Beijing West Road and the Caochangmen bypass tunnel. The station is named after the tunnel and two nearby universities: the Nanjing University of the Arts and the Jiangsu Second Normal University. Caochangmen Station has the longest name of any station on the Nanjing Metro network.

Station layout 

The station is entirely underground and is split across three levels. Immediately below ground level is the station concourse with ticket machines, station agent, and the faregates. The level below has a single island platform for trains on Line 7. The lowest level has a single island platform for trains on Line 4.

References

Railway stations in Jiangsu
Railway stations in China opened in 2017
Nanjing Metro stations
Railway stations in China at university and college campuses